Huachocolpa District is one of nineteen districts of the province Huancavelica in Peru.

Geography 
Some of the highest mountains of the district are listed below:

Ethnic groups 
The people in the district are mainly Indigenous citizens of Quechua descent. Quechua is the language which the majority of the population (54.92%) learnt to speak in childhood, 44.83% of the residents started speaking using the Spanish language (2007 Peru Census).

References